Tabor House may refer to:

in Israel
 Tabor House (Jerusalem)

in the United States
Tabor House (Leadville, Colorado), in National Historic Landmark Leadville Historic District
Pratt-Tabor House, Red Wing, MN, listed on the NRHP in Minnesota
Dr. Joseph A. Tabor House, Pascagoula, MS, listed on the NRHP in Mississippi
Tabor-Wing House, Dover Plains, NY, listed on the NRHP in New York
Tabor House (Checotah, Oklahoma), listed on the NRHP in Oklahoma
Tabor Home for Needy and Destitute Children, Doylestown, PA, listed on the NRHP in Pennsylvania